This is a list of the French SNEP Top 100 Singles and Top 200 Albums number-ones of 2014.

Number ones by week

Singles chart

Albums chart

See also
2014 in music
List of number-one hits (France)
List of top 10 singles in 2014 (France)

References

Number-one hits
France
2014